Imran Nazih (born 26 January 2006) is a Moroccan professional footballer who plays as a midfielder for Volendam.

Professional career
Nazih is a youth product of Nieuw-West United, Zeeburgia, Ajax and Volendam. He began his senior career with Volendam's reserves in 2021, and signed his first professional contract with the club on 11 May 2022 at the age of 16 until 2025. He made his professional debut with Volendam as a late substitute in a 7–1 Eredivisie loss to PSV on 31 August 2022.

Personal life
Born in the Netherlands, Nazih is of Moroccan descent. He played for the Netherlands U16s four times. He was called up to a training camp for the Morocco U17s in May 2022.

References

External links
 
 Ons Oranje profile

2006 births
Living people
Footballers from Amsterdam
Dutch footballers
Netherlands youth international footballers
Dutch sportspeople of Moroccan descent
Association football midfielders
FC Volendam players
Eredivisie players
Tweede Divisie players